Emil Westerlund (6 February 1887 – 18 February 1964) was a Finnish wrestler. He was born in Uusimaa, and was the brother of Edvard Westerlund and Kalle Westerlund. He competed at the 1912 and 1920 Summer Olympics. In 1920 he shared the fifth place in the light-heavyweight class, Freestyle wrestling.

References

External links
 

1887 births
1964 deaths
Olympic wrestlers of Finland
Wrestlers at the 1912 Summer Olympics
Wrestlers at the 1920 Summer Olympics
Finnish male sport wrestlers
Sportspeople from Uusimaa